DreamHack Winter 2017 was an eSports and gaming convention event that was held in Jönköping, Sweden from December 1–4, 2017. The event hosted several eSports tournaments of multiple disciplines, such as Counter-Strike: Global Offensive (DreamHack ASTRO Open 2017), Dota 2, (DreamLeague Season 8), H1Z1 (H1Z1 Elite Series), Hearthstone (DreamHack Hearthstone Grand Prix), Quake Champions (Quake Champions Invitational), and Super Smash Bros. Melee (DreamHack Smash Championship).

References

External links 
 

2017 fighting game tournaments
2017 first-person shooter tournaments
2017 multiplayer online battle arena tournaments
2017 in Swedish sport
Counter-Strike competitions
December 2017 sports events in Europe
Dota competitions
DreamHack events
Esports competitions in Sweden
Sports competitions in Jönköping
Video game trade shows